Maakandoodhoo (Dhivehi: މާކަނޑޫދޫ) is one of the uninhabited islands of the Shaviyani Atoll administrative division and geographically part of the Miladhummadulhu Atoll in the Maldives.

Inhabited until 2004, residents were resettled in the capital of the atoll, Funadhoo and the island of Milandhoo.

The population of the island was around 1166 in 1999. However, the island was greatly damaged during the Boxing Day Tsunami of 2004 and a resettlement programme was initiated soon after.

Uninhabited islands of the Maldives